Promicromonospora sukumoe is a bacterium from the genus Promicromonospora which has been isolated from soil from Sukumo, Japan.

References

Further reading

External links
Type strain of Promicromonospora sukumoe at BacDive -  the Bacterial Diversity Metadatabase	

Micrococcales
Bacteria described in 1988